Hruzke (Ukrainian: Грузьке) is a village in Fastiv Raion of Kyiv Oblast of north Ukraine. It belongs to Byshiv rural hromada, one of the hromadas of Ukraine.

History 

The village was established in 1604. Here was born Haydamak leader Ivan Bondarenko.

Until 18 July 2020, Hruzke belonged to Makariv Raion. The raion was abolished that day as part of the administrative reform of Ukraine, which reduced the number of raions of Kyiv Oblast to seven. The area of Makariv Raion was split between Bucha and Fastiv Raions, with Hruzke being transferred to Fastiv Raion.

Geography 
The village lies at an altitude of 170 metres and covers an area of 0,483 km². It has a population of about 862 people (2013).

Gallery

References

External links 

 Video about Hruzke
 Information about Hruzke on the site of Makariv Regional State Administration
 The history of the village in the project "Cities and villages of Ukraine"
 Букет Є. Історія кожного поселення — сягає коренями у глиб століть // Макарівські вісті. — 2012. — 3 лютого. — No. 5 (10705). — С. 4-5. PDF

Villages in Fastiv Raion